Steeven Saba (born 24 February 1993) is a Haitian professional footballer who plays as a midfielder for Ligue Haïtienne club Violette and the Haiti national team.

Early years
Saba was born in Port-au-Prince and is the son of former footballer Grégory Saba.

Club career

Violette AC

Montreal Impact
On 29 January 2020, Saba signed with the Montreal Impact of Major League Soccer to a one-year deal with options for 2021 and 2022.

Saba recalled his experience signing with the club as a "dream come true" for the opportunity to play for Impact manager and former France legend Thierry Henry. He openly expressed his gratitude to his former Haitian club Violette and the Haiti national team for helping to set the stage for him to participate in the 2019 CONCACAF Gold Cup where his international play had garnered some attention among clubs in the region.

On 12 March 2020, the MLS suspended play due to the COVID-19 pandemic. Saba, like other Impact players during this time, was unable to train inside the club’s facility, having not been cleared from local health authorities and instead held voluntary training sessions. On 20 May 2020, Saba broke his left foot on a routine jog near his home in Montreal and was sidelined for eight to twelve weeks.

On 27 November 2020, Montreal declined to exercise his option for 2021.

International career

United States
Saba, who also holds a United States passport, was called-up by the United States men's national under-18 soccer team for a camp in 2009.

Haiti
Saba made his international debut for Haiti on 29 May 2018 in a friendly match against Argentina. In May 2019, he was named to the Haitian squad for the 2019 CONCACAF Gold Cup. Saba scored his first goal for Haiti during the tournament on 20 June against Nicaragua.

International goals
Scores and results list Haiti's goal tally first.

References

External links

1993 births
Living people
Association football midfielders
Haitian footballers
American soccer players
Sportspeople from Port-au-Prince
American sportspeople of Haitian descent
Haitian expatriate footballers
Violette AC players
CF Montréal players
Ligue Haïtienne players
Haiti international footballers
2019 CONCACAF Gold Cup players
2021 CONCACAF Gold Cup players
American expatriate soccer players
Expatriate soccer players in Canada
Haitian expatriate sportspeople in Canada
American expatriate sportspeople in Canada